Bing is the Mandarin pinyin romanization of the Chinese surname written  in Chinese character. It is romanized Ping in Wade–Giles. Bing is listed 214th in the Song dynasty classic text Hundred Family Surnames. It is not among the 300 most common surnames in China.

Origin
During the Spring and Autumn period (771–476 BC), a government minister of the State of Qi (in modern-day Shandong province) was enfeoffed at the settlement of Bing. He and his descendants adopted Bing as their surname.

Notable people
 Bing Ji (邴吉; died 55 AD), Han dynasty chancellor
 Bing Yuan (邴原), Eastern Han politician
 Bing Zhigang (邴志刚; born 1957), Vice-Governor of Liaoning province

References

Chinese-language surnames
Individual Chinese surnames